The 1790 English cricket season was the 19th in which matches have been awarded retrospective first-class cricket status and the fourth after the foundation of the Marylebone Cricket Club. The season saw 12 first-class matches played in the country.

Samuel Britcher, the MCC scorer, began his annual publication of A list of all the principal Matches of Cricket that have been played, a compilation of match scorecards which he published until after the 1805 season. His 1790 edition features fourteen scorecards, including six from matches played at Lord's Old Ground, the MCC venue.

Matches 
A total of 12 first-class matches were played during the season. Four county teams played first-class matches, along with a Hornchurch side. A West Sussex side is recorded playing a minor match, whilst there is a record of cricket being played in Rutland during the season when an England side played one from Hampshire at The Park, Burley-on-the-Hill.

First mentions
A number of players made their top-class debut during the season.

References

Further reading
 
 
 
 

1790 in English cricket
English cricket seasons in the 18th century